The 2018 Canadian Mixed Doubles Curling Championship was held from March 28 to April 1 at Ken's Furniture Arena and Robinson Arena in Leduc, Alberta

Teams
The teams are listed as follows:

Provincial and Territorial champions

Open entries

Round-robin standings

Draw 1
Wednesday, March 28, 6:00 pm

Draw 2
Wednesday, March 28, 8:30 pm

Draw 3
Thursday, March 29, 8:30 am

Draw 4
Thursday, March 29, 11:00 am

Draw 5
Thursday, March 29, 1:30 pm

Draw 6
Thursday, March 29, 4:00 pm

Draw 7
Thursday, March 29, 6:30 pm

Draw 8
Thursday, March 29, 9:00 pm

Draw 9
Friday, March 30, 8:30 am

Draw 10
Friday, March 30, 11:00 am

Draw 11
Friday, March 30, 1:30 pm

Draw 12
Friday, March 30, 4:00 pm

Draw 13
Friday, March 30, 6:30 pm

Draw 14
Friday, March 30, 9:00 pm

Playoffs
{{16TeamBracket-Compact-NoSeeds-Byes
| RD1= Round of 12
| RD2= Quarterfinals
| RD3= Semifinals
| RD4= Final
| team-width= 200

| RD1-team01=  Park/Thomas
| RD1-score01= 8| RD1-team02=  Murphy/Murphy
| RD1-score02= 2
| RD1-team05=  Carey/Hodgson
| RD1-score05= 7
| RD1-team06=  Sweeting/March 
| RD1-score06= 6
| RD1-team09=   Desjardins/Desjardins
| RD1-score09= 5
| RD1-team10=  Jones/Laing
| RD1-score10= 6| RD1-team13=  Peterman/Samagalski
| RD1-score13= 5
| RD1-team14=  Overton-Clapham/Dunstone
| RD1-score14= 3

| RD2-team01=  Park/Thomas
| RD2-score01= 6
| RD2-team02=  Sahaidak/Lott
| RD2-score02= 9| RD2-team03=  Carey/Hodgson
| RD2-score03= 8
| RD2-team04=  Kitz/Stewart
| RD2-score04= 5
| RD2-team05=  Jones/Laing
| RD2-score05= 3
| RD2-team06=  Crocker/Muyres
| RD2-score06= 7| RD2-team07=  Peterman/Samagalski
| RD2-score07= 5
| RD2-team08=  Courtney/Carruthers
| RD2-score08= 8

| RD3-team01=  Sahaidak/Lott
| RD3-score01= 7| RD3-team02=  Carey/Hodgson
| RD3-score02= 4
| RD3-team03=  Crocker/Muyres
| RD3-score03= 9
| RD3-team04=  Courtney/Carruthers
| RD3-score04= 4

| RD4-team01=  Sahaidak/Lott
| RD4-score01= 7
| RD4-team02=  Crocker/Muyres
| RD4-score02= 8'}}

Round of 12Saturday, March 31, 14:00QuarterfinalsSaturday, March 31, 20:00SemifinalsSunday, April 1, 09:00FinalSunday, April 1, 12:00''

References

External links

Canadian Mixed Doubles Curling Championship
2018 in Canadian curling
Curling in Alberta
2018 in Alberta
April 2018 sports events in Canada
March 2018 sports events in Canada
Leduc, Alberta